The 10th Lux Style Awards ceremony was held in Expo Center in Karachi, Pakistan. The show was hosted by Mahira Khan, Faizan Haque and from the members of BNN. The show had the performances by HSY and Reema Khan, Aaminah Haq, Ammar Bilal, Meera, Mahira and Ahsan Khan etc. Special tribute was paid to late Moin Akhtar. Some of the film and music categories were removed from the award.

Winners and nominations

Television

Music

Fashion

Special

References

Lux Style Awards
Lux Style Awards
Lux Style Awards
Lux Style Awards
Lux
Lux
Lux